is a Japanese judoka.

Kubota is from Kawasaki, Kanagawa. He began judo at the age of a 2nd grader and after graduation from Kokushikan University, he belonged to Tokyo Metropolitan Police Department

Kubota received a gold medal at the Jigoro Kano Cup in 1996 and silver medal at the World Masters Munich in 1997. He also participate Asian Games in 1998, but defeated by Kwak Ok-Chol from North Korea

As of 2009, Kubota coaches judo at All-Japan national team and Tokyo Metropolitan Police Department.

References 

Japanese male judoka
People from Kawasaki, Kanagawa
1975 births
Living people
Judoka at the 1998 Asian Games
Universiade medalists in judo
Universiade gold medalists for Japan
Asian Games competitors for Japan
Medalists at the 1995 Summer Universiade
20th-century Japanese people
21st-century Japanese people